Juan Carlos Carrillo Palacio (born 10 October 1992) is a Colombian boxer. He competed in the light heavyweight event at the 2016 Summer Olympics.

References

External links
 
 
 
 

1992 births
Living people
Colombian male boxers
Olympic boxers of Colombia
Boxers at the 2016 Summer Olympics
Boxers at the 2010 Summer Youth Olympics
Pan American Games medalists in boxing
Pan American Games bronze medalists for Colombia
Boxers at the 2015 Pan American Games
Central American and Caribbean Games silver medalists for Colombia
Competitors at the 2014 Central American and Caribbean Games
Sportspeople from Barranquilla
Light-heavyweight boxers
Central American and Caribbean Games medalists in boxing
Medalists at the 2015 Pan American Games
21st-century Colombian people